Neelo Begum (born Cynthia Alexander Fernandes; née Abida Riaz; 30 June 1940 – 30 January 2021) was a Pakistani veteran film actress. She made her film debut in 1956 with Hollywood film Bhowani Junction. She was known as The Queen of Romance and The Princess of Romance for her portrayal of romantic roles. She worked in more than one hundred and thirty-four Pakistani films including Urdu and Punjabi language films. 

She was the recipient of numerous awards, including Nigar Awards, she earned recognition after appearing in a song "Aaye Mausam Rangilay Suhanay" from the film Saat Lakh and after playing lead role in Zarqa.

Early life 
Born into a Catholic family, she adopted a Muslim name, Abida Riaz after marrying a Pakistani filmmaker, Riaz Shahid in 1965. She is the mother of film actor Shaan Shahid.

Neelo was born on 30 June 1940 in Bhera, British India. She did her primary schooling from Kinnaird High School, Lahore.

Controversies
In 1965, at the peak of her popularity, she was summoned by Nawab Malik Amir Mohammad Khan, then Governor of West Pakistan, to dance on stage for the Shah of Iran during his official visit to Pakistan; but she refused to do it for her own reasons. Harassed and threatened, Neelo faced dire consequences for refusing to obey official orders. She was allegedly gang molested and attempted suicide on the way to the Governor's house and was taken to a hospital instead, where the doctors saved her life.

News of the incident generated widespread public backlash against the Nawab.  The renowned leftist poet Habib Jalib, on hearing of the incident, expressed his anguish in his poem over her attempted suicide: "Tu kay nawaqif-e-aadab-e-ghulami hae abhi...raqs zanjeer pehan ker bhi kya jata hae" (meaning: "unaware art thou yet of the rites of enslavement...dance can be performed even while enchained".) Later this poem was used in the film Zarqa (1969) with slight changes in the words and ended up becoming a super-hit film song in Pakistan. The film song became much more relevant, effective and popular because it was picturised on Neelo herself and was based on similar real life events in Neelo's life. She also won the Best Actress Nigar Award for film Zarqa (1969). It had superb music by Wajahat Attre and was sung by Mehdi Hassan. Film Zarqa (1969) was produced and directed by Riaz Shahid who also wrote its screenplay. Neelo helped her husband, Riaz Shahid, produce this film and it became the best known film of her career.

Personal life
Neelo was born into a Catholic family. She adopted the name Abida Riaz after accepting Islam at the time of her marriage to film screenwriter and film director Riaz Shahid. Riaz Shahid suddenly died in 1972.

Illness and death
She died from blood cancer on 30 January 2021 in Lahore.

Filmography

1956  Bhowani Junction
1956: Sabira
1957: Anjaam
1957: Bholey Khan
1957: Pasban
1957: Sehti
1957: Saat Lakh
1957: Yakke Wali
1957: Aankh Ka Nashah
1958: Akhri Nishan
1958: Changez Khan
1958: Darbar
1958: Jan-e-Bahar
1958: Jatti
1958: Kachian Kaliyan
1958: Mumtaz
1958: Nayi Larki
1958: Neya Daur
1958: Sheikh Chilli
1958: Zehr-e-Ishq
1959: Koel
1959: Lalkaar
1959: Lukkan Mitti
1959: Neend
1959: Shama
1959: Shera
1959: Sola Aanay
1959: Suchhey Moti
1959: Saathi
1959: Yaar Beli
1960: Alladin Ka Beta
1960: Ayaz
1960: Insaaf
1960: Khyber Mail
1960: Manzil
1960: Neelofar
1960: Shehzadi
1960: Street 77
1961: Bara Bajje
1961: Do Raste
1961: Subha Kahin Sham Kahin
1962: Azra
1962: Banjaran
1962: Barsaat mein
1962: Darwaza
1962: Dosheeza
1962: Ghunghat
1962: Husn-o-Ishq
1962: Unche Mahal
1963: Barat
1963: Daaman
1963: Ishq par zor nahin
1963: Kala Aadmi
1963: Mouj Mela
1963: Qatal ke baad
1963: Shikwa
1963: Aman
1964: Beti
1964: Daachi
1964: Gehra Daagh
1964: Jugni
1964: Khyber Pass
1964: Mera Mahi
1964: Nehle peh Dehla
1964: Sher di Bachi
1965: Fareb
1965: Jeedar
1965: Raqqasa
1966: Abba Jee
1966: Ann Parh
1966: Badnaam
1966: Chughalkhor
1966: Laado
1966: Mr. Allah Ditta
1966: Naghma.e-Sehra
1966: Nizam Lohar
1966: Payal Ki Jhankar
1967: Chattan
1967: Dil Da Jani
1967: Neeli Baar
1967: Ravi Paar
1967: Sham Savera
1967: Yaar Maar
1968: Jag Beeti
1968: Lala Rukh
1968: Paristan
1968: Wohti
1969: Aukha Jatt
1969: Zarqa
1971: Karishma
1974: Khatarnak
1975: Athra
1975: Balwant Kaur
1975: Dhan Jigra Maa Da
1975: Heera Phumman
1975: Izzat
1975: Jailor te Qaidi
1975: Mera Naa Patey Khan
1975: Rajjo
1975: Sir Da Badla
1975: Sultana Daku
1975: Watan Iman
1976: Ayyash
1976: Gangu Puttar Maa Da
1976: Jatt Kurrian Taun Darda
1976: Khaufnaak
1976: Kil Kil Mera Naa
1976: Pindiwal
1976: Wardat
1977: Ajj Dian Kurrian
1977: Akhri Goli
1977: Danka
1977: Jurm main keeta si
1977: Malikzada
1977: Mere Badshah
1977: Sadqay Teri Mout Tun
1977: Tera vi jawab nahin
1978: Chamman Khan
1978: Gharib da baal
1978: Ghunda
1978: Haidar Daler
1978: Inqalab
1978: Mazi, haal aur mustaqbil
1978: Nazrana
1978: Sharif Shehri
1978: Tax
1979: General Bakht Khan
1979: Mout meri zindagi
1979: Order
1980: Chhotay Nawab
1980: Heera Puttar
1982: Khatra 440
1989: Barood ki Chhaon
1990: Bulandi
1990: Jur'at
2013: Waar

Tribute and honour
Actress and model Iqra Aziz held a tribute in her memory on International Women's Day and described her a very fine actress, successful individual, an amazing wife, and a wonderful mother. The Government of Pakistan named a street and intersection after her in Lahore on August 16th, 2021.

Awards and recognition

References

External links

Filmography of actress Neelo on Complete Index To World Film website Archived

1940 births
Actresses in Pashto cinema
2021 deaths
Pakistani film actresses
Nigar Award winners
People from Sargodha District
Punjabi people
20th-century Pakistani actresses
Recipients of Sitara-i-Imtiaz
21st-century Pakistani actresses
Pakistani former Christians
Converts to Sunni Islam from Catholicism
Actresses in Urdu cinema
Actresses in Punjabi cinema